Asha Patera is a patera, or a complex crater with scalloped edges, on Jupiter's moon Io. It is named after asha, the Zoroastrian principle of Truth. Its name was adopted by the International Astronomical Union in 1979. Reiden Patera and Kami-Nari Patera can both be found to the west.

References

Surface features of Io (moon)